The province of Grosseto is a province in the Tuscany region of Italy. Its capital is the city of Grosseto. As of 2013 the province had a total population of 225,098 people.

Geography 

The province is bordered to the northwest by the Province of Livorno, to the north by the Province of Pisa, to the northeast by the Province of Siena, and to the southeast by the Province of Viterbo in Lazio. To the south is the Tyrrhenian Sea, which includes the southern islands of the Tuscan archipelago, including Isola del Giglio and the smaller Giannutri islands and Formiche di Grosseto and Formica di Burano. The Arcipelago Toscano National Park spans both the provinces of Grosseto and Livorno, and includes the seven main islands of the Tuscan Archipelago: Elba, Isola del Giglio, Capraia, Montecristo, Pianosa, Giannutri, Gorgona, and some of the minor islands and rock outcrops.

The Colline Metallifere (Metalliferous Hills) line the border in the south with Lazio, and contain the Natural Park of Maremma, that protects also some of the remainings of the large swamps that once covered the area. Other protected areas are the Diaccia Botrona marshland. The principal rivers are the Ombrone, Fiora, Albegna, Pecora, Bruna, Merse, Farma and Chiarone. The coastline between the Gulf of Follonica and the mouth of the Chiarone is dominated by blue waters and pine forests, and is home to resorts such as Marina di Grosseto, Principina a Mare, Castiglione della Pescaia, Punta Ala, Puntone di Scarlino and Talamone. Lakes include Lago dell'Accesa, Lago di Burano, Lago di San Floriano and Lago Acquato. Also of note is the volcanic cone of Mount Amiata, Bandite di Scarlino (213 m),  Promontorio di Punta Ala e delle Rocchette (350 m), Monti dell'Uccellina (417 m), Monte Argentario (635 m), and Promontorio di Ansedonia (113 m).

Comuni 
There are 28  in the province.
As of June 2014, the main  by population are:

This is the complete list of comuni in the province of Grosseto:

Arcidosso
Campagnatico
Capalbio
Castel del Piano
Castell'Azzara
Castiglione della Pescaia
Cinigiano
Civitella Paganico
Follonica
Gavorrano
Grosseto
Isola del Giglio
Magliano in Toscana
Manciano
Massa Marittima
Monte Argentario
Monterotondo Marittimo
Montieri
Orbetello
Pitigliano
Roccalbegna
Roccastrada
Santa Fiora
Scansano
Scarlino
Seggiano
Semproniano
Sorano

Frazioni 
This is the complete list of the  – towns and villages – in the province of Grosseto:

Alberese
Albinia
Ansedonia
Arcille
Baccinello
Bagno di Gavorrano
Bagnoli
Bagnolo
Bagnore
Batignano
Boccheggiano
Borgo Carige
Borgo Santa Rita
Braccagni
Buriano
Caldana
Cana
Capalbio Scalo
Casale di Pari
Casone
Castellaccia
Castell'Ottieri
Castiglioncello Bandini
Catabbio
Cellena
Cerreto
Chiarone Scalo
Civitella Marittima
Dogana
Elmo
Filare
Fonteblanda
Frassine
Gerfalco
Ghirlanda
Giannella
Giannutri
Giardino
Giglio Campese
Giglio Castello
Giglio Porto
Giuncarico
Grilli
Istia d'Ombrone
La Torba
Lago Boracifero
Le Macchie
Marina di Grosseto
Marroneto
Marrucheti
Marsiliana
Monte Antico
Montebamboli
Montebuono
Montegiovi
Montelaterone
Montemassi
Montemerano
Montenero d'Orcia
Montepescali
Montevitozzo
Montiano
Monticello Amiata
Montorgiali
Montorio
Montorsaio
Murci
Niccioleta
Nomadelfia
Paganico
Pancole
Pari
Pereta
Pescia Fiorentina
Pescina
Petricci
Pian d'Alma
Pian di Rocca
Piloni
Poderi di Montemerano
Poggi del Sasso
Poggio Capanne
Poggio Murella
Poggioferro
Polveraia
Pomonte
Porrona
Porto Ercole
Porto Santo Stefano
Potassa
Prata
Preselle
Principina a Mare
Principina Terra
Punta Ala
Puntone di Scarlino
Ravi
Ribolla
Rispescia
Roccamare
Roccatederighi
Rocchette
Rocchette di Fazio
Roselle
Salaiola
San Donato
San Giovanni delle Contee
San Lorenzo
San Martino sul Fiora
San Quirico
San Valentino
Santa Caterina
Sasso d'Ombrone
Sassofortino
Saturnia
Scarlino Scalo
Selva
Selvena
Sovana
Sticciano
Stribugliano
Talamone
Tatti
Tirli
Torniella
Travale
Triana
Vallerona
Valpiana
Vetulonia
Zancona

Government

List of presidents of the province of Grosseto

References

External links

  

 
G
Grosseto